Kangni Frederic Ananou (born 20 September 1997) is a professional footballer who plays as a centre back for German  club Hansa Rostock. Born in Germany, he plays for the Togo national team.

Club career
Ananou came through the youth ranks at 1. FC Köln before joining Dutch side Roda JC Kerkrade in summer 2016.

On 3 July 2022, Ananou joined Hansa Rostock on a one-season deal.

International career
Ananou was born in Germany to Togolese parents. He was called up and capped by the Germany U19 and U20 teams in 2016. He debuted for the Togo national team in a 3–0 friendly win over Sierra Leone on 24 March 2022.

Career statistics

References

External links

 
 

1997 births
Living people
Footballers from Munich
Togolese footballers
Togo international footballers
German footballers
Germany youth international footballers
German people of Togolese descent
Association football central defenders
1. FC Köln players
Roda JC Kerkrade players
FC Ingolstadt 04 players
FC Ingolstadt 04 II players
SC Paderborn 07 players
FC Hansa Rostock players
Eredivisie players
2. Bundesliga players
3. Liga players
Regionalliga players
Bayernliga players
German expatriate footballers
Togolese expatriate footballers
German expatriates in the Netherlands
Togolese expatriates in the Netherlands
Expatriate footballers in the Netherlands